Adam Maciejewski (born 31 January 1967 in Pruszków) is a Polish economist and manager. He is president of the Management Board of the Warsaw Stock Exchange.

Biography
Maciejewski graduated from Warsaw School of Economics. He has been authorised to represent the Polish State Treasury on supervisory boards.

Since 1994, he has worked for the Warsaw Stock Exchange in several management functions. Since 28 June 2006 he has been a member of the management board. On behalf of WSE, he has been main negotiator of the strategic agreements with NYSE Euronext. On 17 January 2013 he was appointed President of the Management Board. In addition, he serves as chairman of the Supervisory Board of the Polish Power Exchange and chairman of the Supervisory Board of BondSpot. Maciejewski is a jury member at the Galeria Chwały Polskiej Ekonomii.

References

External links
 Adam Maciejewski - President of the Management Board of the Warsaw Stock Exchange , biography, website, Warsaw Stock Exchange

Polish businesspeople
SGH Warsaw School of Economics alumni
Living people
1967 births
Polish economists
People from Pruszków